The 1934 Kilkenny Senior Hurling Championship was the 40th staging of the Kilkenny Senior Hurling Championship since its establishment by the Kilkenny County Board.

Tullaroan won the championship after a 6-06 to 1-05 defeat of Carrickshock in the final. It was their 17th championship title overall and their second title in succession. Carrickshock became the first team to lose three successive finals.

References

Kilkenny Senior Hurling Championship
Kilkenny Senior Hurling Championship